Tactical to Practical with Hunter Ellis is a program that ran from 2003 to 2005 on The History Channel. Each episode documents ways in which technologies utilized by the civilian public were originally developed to serve military purposes. The show is hosted by Hunter Ellis.

External links
 
 

History (American TV channel) original programming
2003 American television series debuts
2005 American television series endings